Ricomincio da tre, internationally released as I'm Starting from Three, is a 1981 Italian comedy film directed, co-written, and starring Massimo Troisi in his film debut. The film was awarded with two David di Donatello awards for Best Film and Best Actor.

Plot 

Gaetano is a shy Neapolitan boy who lives in a southern-Italian city with his family: one brother, one sister, his mother and his father, an extremely Catholic man who has lost his right hand, and confides in a miracle by Madonna of the swords to get it back.

Tired and bored about the excessive provincialism of his "entourage", and his alienating job in a food factory, Gaetano decides to hitch-hike to the more modern and cosmopolitan city of Florence. There he meets a beautiful girl, Marta, and they fall in love. Gaetano sets at Marta's and is later joined by his old friend Lello, a clumsy and rotund boy, albeit very funny in his friendship with the protagonist.

One night at Marta's, while reading a manuscript, Marta reveals to be pregnant, and she's not sure that Gaetano is the child's father: Marta had a relationship with a teenager boy, and she sincerely tells the whole story to Gaetano, that gets sad and embittered, and goes back to Naples, officially for his sister's wedding, actually to clear his mind about the facts. There he discovers himself very in love with Marta and rejoins her back in Florence, accepting her child even if he's not sure of being the natural father.

Cast 
 Massimo Troisi: Gaetano
 Fiorenza Marchegiani: Marta
 Lello Arena: Lello
 Marco Messeri: The Madman 
 Lino Troisi: Ugo, Gaetano's father  
 Renato Scarpa: Robertino 
 Jeanne Mas: Jeanne

References

External links

1981 films
Commedia all'italiana
Films directed by Massimo Troisi
Italian comedy films
1981 comedy films
1981 directorial debut films
1980s Italian-language films
1980s Italian films